Alessandro Agostinelli (1965) is an Italian writer, journalist and poet.

Early life
Born in Follonica, he obtained a Ph.D. in "history of visual arts and show business".

Journalism
He worked for Radio 24, Radio Tre Rai, Il Riformista, Il Fatto Quotidiano and L'Unità.  He also worked with the magazines Polis and Zone.

Travel journalism
One of his topic of interest is the concept of "travel". He writes the travel blog Atlante for the weekly magazine L'Espresso and was of the author of the Lonely Planet's guides in Italian for Tuscany and also specifically for Florence (in 2014).

He is the president of the Società Italiana Viaggiatori and the director of the Festival del Viaggio.

In 2011 he published Honolulu baby, a book of anecdotes and histories about the Hawaiian Islands but also about the role of writing during travel.

In 2018 he celebrated the 500th year from Leonardo Da Vinci's death with a trip from Vinci to Amboise, in France.

American culture
He wrote a biographical novel about Charlie Parker, Benedetti da Parker, and the essay Individualismo e Noir about U.S. cinema and specifically the economical and social roots of the noir genre and its relationship with the western one.

Poetry
He has published in Spain his anthological poetry book titled En el rojo de Occidente. In 2014 he became in charge of Poesia serie rossa, the editorial collection about poetry of the ETS publisher, one of the few new ones started in Italy at the time. His poetries have been translated and published in Spain, Portugal, France, Germany and United States.

In 2019 he wrote the preface to the anthology Dix poètes italiens contemporains published in France by Le bousquet-la barthe.

Works

Poetry 
 Numeri e Parole, 1997, Campanotto
  Agosto e Temporali, 2000, ETS
 Il Cristo dei poeti, 2010, ETS
 En el rojo de Ocidente, 2014, Olifante, 
 L’ospite perfetta. Sonetti italian, 2020, Samuele Editore

Novels 
 La vita secca, 2002, Besa,  
 Alessandro Agostinelli, Athos Bigongiali, Sergio Costanzo, Marco Malvaldi, Matteo Pelliti, Ugo Riccarelli, Luca Ricci, Alessandro Scarpellini, Sosteneva Tabucchi, 2013, Felici Editore, 
 Benedetti da Parker, 2017, Cairo Editore.
 Racconti di Viaggio

Essays 
 Fosfori: 17 racconti di autori italiani contemporanei, Marco Nardi, 1992, Florence, 
 Alessandro Agostinelli, Daniele Luti, Sera di Volterra. Viaggio nei luoghi e nelle storie di una città antica, 2000, ETS, 
La società del giovanimento. Perché l'Occidente muore senza invecchiare, 2004, Castelvecchi, 
Una filosofia del cinema americano - Individualismo e Noir, 2004, ETS, 
Pisa & Livorno, istruzioni sulla guerra e sui campanili, 2006, Zona
 Alessandro Agostinelli, Tito Barbini, Paolo Ciampi, Parole in viaggio. Piccola guida di scrittura per viaggiatori veri e immaginari, 2014, Romano Editore,  
Un mondo perfetto. Gli otto comandamenti dei fratelli Coen, 2010, Editrice Besa Controluce, 
David Lynch e il Grande Fratello, 2011, Besa, 
 Bernard Vanel (translator), Alessandro Agostinelli (preface), Dix poètes italiens contemporains. Dieci poeti italiani contemporanei, 2018, lebousquet-la barthe,

Travel guides and travel literature 
Honolulu baby. Avventure hawaiane di musica, surf, vulcani e chiari di luna, 2011, Vallecchi, 
Firenze, 2014, EDT, 
Da Vinci su tre ruote. In scooter alla scopeDa Vinci alla Francia in sella allo scooter: lo scrittore segue le orme di Leonardo rta del genio, 2020, Exòrma.

References

External links 

Italian male poets
Italian male journalists
1965 births
Living people
People from Follonica